The 1943 Pittsburgh Pirates season was the 62nd season of the Pittsburgh Pirates franchise; the 57th in the National League. The Pirates finished fourth in the league standings with a record of 80–74.

Regular season

Season standings

Record vs. opponents

Game log

|- bgcolor="ccffcc"
| 1 || April 21 || @ Cubs || 6–0 || Sewell (1–0) || Derringer || — || 9,044 || 1–0
|- bgcolor="ffbbbb"
| 2 || April 22 || @ Cubs || 3–4 || Hanyzewski || Dietz (0–1) || — || 3,325 || 1–1
|- bgcolor="ffbbbb"
| 3 || April 24 || @ Cubs || 3–6 || Bithorn || Hallett (0–1) || — || 6,771 || 1–2
|- bgcolor="ccffcc"
| 4 || April 25 || @ Cubs || 6–2 || Sewell (2–0) || Warneke || — || 7,349 || 2–2
|- bgcolor="ccffcc"
| 5 || April 27 || Reds || 4–1 || Lanning (1–0) || Starr || Rescigno (1) || 11,937 || 3–2
|- bgcolor="ffbbbb"
| 6 || April 28 || Reds || 1–3 || Riddle || Hebert (0–1) || Beggs || 2,121 || 3–3
|- bgcolor="ffbbbb"
| 7 || April 29 || Reds || 1–6 || Vander Meer || Gornicki (0–1) || — || 3,146 || 3–4
|-

|- bgcolor="ccffcc"
| 8 || May 1 || Cubs || 6–3 || Sewell (3–0) || Passeau || — || 2,667 || 4–4
|- bgcolor="ccffcc"
| 9 || May 2 || Cubs || 3–0 || Hebert (1–1) || Bithorn || — || 16,491 || 5–4
|- bgcolor="ccffcc"
| 10 || May 2 || Cubs || 1–0 || Klinger (1–0) || Barrett || — || 16,491 || 6–4
|- bgcolor="ffbbbb"
| 11 || May 3 || @ Reds || 5–7 || Vander Meer || Dietz (0–2) || Riddle || 2,958 || 6–5
|- bgcolor="ccffcc"
| 12 || May 4 || @ Reds || 8–3 || Rescigno (1–0) || Starr || — || 1,685 || 7–5
|- bgcolor="ffbbbb"
| 13 || May 5 || @ Reds || 2–3 || Walters || Lanning (1–1) || — || 8,370 || 7–6
|- bgcolor="ffbbbb"
| 14 || May 9 || Cardinals || 1–8 || Cooper || Hebert (1–2) || — || 25,887 || 7–7
|- bgcolor="ffffff"
| 15 || May 9 || Cardinals || 3–3 ||  ||  || — || 25,887 || 7–7
|- bgcolor="ffbbbb"
| 16 || May 13 || @ Dodgers || 4–5 || Webber || Dietz (0–3) || — || 6,735 || 7–8
|- bgcolor="ccffcc"
| 17 || May 14 || @ Dodgers || 5–2 || Gornicki (1–1) || Fitzsimmons || — || 7,230 || 8–8
|- bgcolor="ffbbbb"
| 18 || May 15 || @ Giants || 1–2 (11) || Adams || Rescigno (1–1) || — || 6,856 || 8–9
|- bgcolor="ffbbbb"
| 19 || May 16 || @ Giants || 1–3 || Wittig || Butcher (0–1) || — || 13,056 || 8–10
|- bgcolor="ccffcc"
| 20 || May 16 || @ Giants || 2–1 || Klinger (2–0) || Trinkle || — || 13,056 || 9–10
|- bgcolor="ffbbbb"
| 21 || May 18 || @ Braves || 0–4 || Javery || Sewell (3–1) || — || 1,026 || 9–11
|- bgcolor="ffbbbb"
| 22 || May 19 || @ Braves || 1–2 (11) || Andrews || Rescigno (1–2) || — || — || 9–12
|- bgcolor="ffbbbb"
| 23 || May 19 || @ Braves || 3–5 || Jeffcoat || Gornicki (1–2) || Stout || 4,959 || 9–13
|- bgcolor="ffbbbb"
| 24 || May 22 || @ Phillies || 0–10 || Rowe || Klinger (2–1) || — || 11,692 || 9–14
|- bgcolor="ccffcc"
| 25 || May 23 || @ Phillies || 4–1 || Sewell (4–1) || Podgajny || — || — || 10–14
|- bgcolor="ffbbbb"
| 26 || May 23 || @ Phillies || 2–5 || Kraus || Rescigno (1–3) || Johnson || — || 10–15
|- bgcolor="ccffcc"
| 27 || May 26 || Dodgers || 17–4 || Hebert (2–2) || Macon || — || 2,130 || 11–15
|- bgcolor="ccffcc"
| 28 || May 27 || Dodgers || 9–5 || Lanning (2–1) || Melton || Butcher (1) || 14,724 || 12–15
|- bgcolor="ffbbbb"
| 29 || May 28 || Dodgers || 2–6 || Head || Gornicki (1–3) || — || 2,456 || 12–16
|- bgcolor="ccffcc"
| 30 || May 29 || Phillies || 12–4 || Rescigno (2–3) || Gerheauser || — || 1,727 || 13–16
|- bgcolor="ccffcc"
| 31 || May 30 || Phillies || 4–3 || Sewell (5–1) || Rowe || — || — || 14–16
|- bgcolor="ccffcc"
| 32 || May 30 || Phillies || 2–1 (10) || Hebert (3–2) || Kraus || — || 7,297 || 15–16
|- bgcolor="ffbbbb"
| 33 || May 31 || Braves || 1–6 || Tobin || Brandt (0–1) || — || 14,391 || 15–17
|- bgcolor="ccffcc"
| 34 || May 31 || Braves || 4–0 || Klinger (3–1) || Salvo || — || 14,391 || 16–17
|-

|- bgcolor="ccffcc"
| 35 || June 1 || Braves || 5–4 (14) || Lanning (3–1) || Javery || — || 1,077 || 17–17
|- bgcolor="ccffcc"
| 36 || June 2 || Braves || 3–2 || Rescigno (3–3) || Andrews || — || 10,162 || 18–17
|- bgcolor="ccffcc"
| 37 || June 3 || Giants || 9–6 || Sewell (6–1) || Trinkle || Lanning (1) || 3,051 || 19–17
|- bgcolor="ccffcc"
| 38 || June 4 || Giants || 9–8 || Butcher (1–1) || Mungo || Gornicki (1) || 14,120 || 20–17
|- bgcolor="ffbbbb"
| 39 || June 5 || Giants || 1–5 || Hubbell || Rescigno (3–4) || — || 3,186 || 20–18
|- bgcolor="ccffcc"
| 40 || June 6 || Giants || 18–1 || Klinger (4–1) || Melton || — || — || 21–18
|- bgcolor="ccffcc"
| 41 || June 6 || Giants || 7–0 || Hallett (1–1) || Wittig || — || 21,358 || 22–18
|- bgcolor="ffbbbb"
| 42 || June 7 || Dodgers || 1–4 || Fitzsimmons || Hebert (3–3) || — || 19,162 || 22–19
|- bgcolor="ffbbbb"
| 43 || June 9 || @ Cardinals || 3–4 || Cooper || Sewell (6–2) || — || 2,365 || 22–20
|- bgcolor="ffbbbb"
| 44 || June 10 || @ Cardinals || 0–5 || Lanier || Gornicki (1–4) || — || 13,356 || 22–21
|- bgcolor="ffbbbb"
| 45 || June 12 || @ Cardinals || 0–1 || Pollet || Hallett (1–2) || — || 3,022 || 22–22
|- bgcolor="ccffcc"
| 46 || June 13 || @ Cardinals || 10–3 || Hebert (4–3) || Brecheen || — || 16,255 || 23–22
|- bgcolor="ffffff"
| 47 || June 13 || @ Cardinals || 4–4 (12) ||  ||  || — || 16,255 || 23–22
|- bgcolor="ccffcc"
| 48 || June 15 || Cubs || 4–2 || Sewell (7–2) || Prim || — || 1,707 || 24–22
|- bgcolor="ccffcc"
| 49 || June 16 || Cubs || 5–2 || Gornicki (2–4) || Bithorn || — || 12,389 || 25–22
|- bgcolor="ffbbbb"
| 50 || June 17 || Cubs || 2–3 (7) || Derringer || Hebert (4–4) || — || 2,071 || 25–23
|- bgcolor="ffbbbb"
| 51 || June 18 || Reds || 0–1 (14) || Starr || Butcher (1–2) || — || 2,274 || 25–24
|- bgcolor="ccffcc"
| 52 || June 19 || Reds || 4–3 (11) || Lanning (4–1) || Shoun || — || 4,235 || 26–24
|- bgcolor="ccffcc"
| 53 || June 20 || Reds || 5–4 || Sewell (8–2) || Vander Meer || — || — || 27–24
|- bgcolor="ccffcc"
| 54 || June 20 || Reds || 4–2 || Rescigno (4–4) || Beggs || Lanning (2) || 27,392 || 28–24
|- bgcolor="ffbbbb"
| 55 || June 22 || @ Cubs || 0–1 || Derringer || Podgajny (0–1) || — || 3,783 || 28–25
|- bgcolor="ffbbbb"
| 56 || June 23 || @ Cubs || 1–4 || Passeau || Hebert (4–5) || — || — || 28–26
|- bgcolor="ccffcc"
| 57 || June 23 || @ Cubs || 7–5 || Gornicki (3–4) || Fleming || — || 8,893 || 29–26
|- bgcolor="ccffcc"
| 58 || June 24 || @ Cubs || 2–1 || Sewell (9–2) || Lee || — || 3,217 || 30–26
|- bgcolor="ccffcc"
| 59 || June 26 || @ Reds || 9–0 || Butcher (2–2) || Vander Meer || — || 2,104 || 31–26
|- bgcolor="ffbbbb"
| 60 || June 27 || @ Reds || 3–6 || Riddle || Podgajny (0–2) || — || 12,015 || 31–27
|- bgcolor="ffbbbb"
| 61 || June 27 || @ Reds || 1–5 || Starr || Gornicki (3–5) || Beggs || 12,015 || 31–28
|- bgcolor="ccffcc"
| 62 || June 28 || Reds || 7–1 || Sewell (10–2) || Walters || — || 12,979 || 32–28
|- bgcolor="ffffff"
| 63 || June 30 || @ Phillies || 3–3 (11) ||  ||  || — || 10,655 || 32–28
|-

|- bgcolor="ffbbbb"
| 64 || July 1 || @ Phillies || 1–6 || Rowe || Podgajny (0–3) || — || — || 32–29
|- bgcolor="ccffcc"
| 65 || July 1 || @ Phillies || 2–1 || Klinger (5–1) || Gerheauser || — || 6,884 || 33–29
|- bgcolor="ccffcc"
| 66 || July 2 || @ Phillies || 2–1 || Sewell (11–2) || Kraus || — || 3,669 || 34–29
|- bgcolor="ccffcc"
| 67 || July 3 || @ Braves || 10–1 || Rescigno (5–4) || Javery || — || 2,559 || 35–29
|- bgcolor="ffbbbb"
| 68 || July 4 || @ Braves || 1–3 || Barrett || Hebert (4–6) || — || — || 35–30
|- bgcolor="ffbbbb"
| 69 || July 4 || @ Braves || 0–13 || Tobin || Gornicki (3–6) || — || 13,275 || 35–31
|- bgcolor="ccffcc"
| 70 || July 5 || @ Giants || 8–4 || Butcher (3–2) || Melton || — || — || 36–31
|- bgcolor="ffbbbb"
| 71 || July 5 || @ Giants || 0–9 || Chase || Klinger (5–2) || — || 8,688 || 36–32
|- bgcolor="ccffcc"
| 72 || July 8 || @ Dodgers || 8–2 || Sewell (12–2) || Fitzsimmons || — || 7,075 || 37–32
|- bgcolor="ffbbbb"
| 73 || July 9 || @ Dodgers || 7–8 (10) || Higbe || Klinger (5–3) || — || 9,563 || 37–33
|- bgcolor="ffbbbb"
| 74 || July 10 || @ Dodgers || 6–23 || Davis || Podgajny (0–4) || — || 14,631 || 37–34
|- bgcolor="ccffcc"
| 75 || July 11 || @ Dodgers || 3–2 || Butcher (4–2) || Higbe || — || — || 38–34
|- bgcolor="ffbbbb"
| 76 || July 11 || @ Dodgers || 4–5 || Allen || Rescigno (5–5) || Head || 28,696 || 38–35
|- bgcolor="ccffcc"
| 77 || July 15 || Cardinals || 4–3 || Klinger (6–3) || Lanier || — || 24,578 || 39–35
|- bgcolor="ccffcc"
| 78 || July 16 || Cardinals || 9–5 || Sewell (13–2) || Krist || — || 4,050 || 40–35
|- bgcolor="ccffcc"
| 79 || July 17 || Cardinals || 7–3 || Butcher (5–2) || Brecheen || — || — || 41–35
|- bgcolor="ccffcc"
| 80 || July 17 || Cardinals || 3–2 || Hebert (5–6) || Munger || — || 11,362 || 42–35
|- bgcolor="ffbbbb"
| 81 || July 18 || Cardinals || 4–7 || Cooper || Gornicki (3–7) || — || — || 42–36
|- bgcolor="ffbbbb"
| 82 || July 18 || Cardinals || 5–6 || Munger || Sewell (13–3) || Cooper || 34,349 || 42–37
|- bgcolor="ccffcc"
| 83 || July 20 || Phillies || 1–0 || Sewell (14–3) || Barrett || — || 11,996 || 43–37
|- bgcolor="ccffcc"
| 84 || July 21 || Phillies || 10–2 || Klinger (7–3) || Conger || — || 2,041 || 44–37
|- bgcolor="ffbbbb"
| 85 || July 22 || Phillies || 0–3 || Rowe || Butcher (5–3) || — || — || 44–38
|- bgcolor="ffbbbb"
| 86 || July 22 || Phillies || 6–9 || Kraus || Gornicki (3–8) || — || 5,199 || 44–39
|- bgcolor="ccffcc"
| 87 || July 23 || Phillies || 3–2 || Gee (1–0) || Gerheauser || — || 1,895 || 45–39
|- bgcolor="ccffcc"
| 88 || July 24 || Dodgers || 6–1 || Sewell (15–3) || Melton || — || 5,951 || 46–39
|- bgcolor="ccffcc"
| 89 || July 25 || Dodgers || 7–1 || Klinger (8–3) || Head || — || — || 47–39
|- bgcolor="ccffcc"
| 90 || July 25 || Dodgers || 7–1 || Hebert (6–6) || Higbe || — || 30,309 || 48–39
|- bgcolor="ffbbbb"
| 91 || July 26 || Dodgers || 6–10 (10) || Macon || Butcher (5–4) || — || 6,125 || 48–40
|- bgcolor="ccffcc"
| 92 || July 27 || Giants || 8–5 || Gee (2–0) || Chase || — || 2,735 || 49–40
|- bgcolor="ccffcc"
| 93 || July 28 || Giants || 8–3 || Sewell (16–3) || Hubbell || — || 29,585 || 50–40
|- bgcolor="ffbbbb"
| 94 || July 30 || Giants || 7–13 || Melton || Klinger (8–4) || Adams || 2,851 || 50–41
|- bgcolor="ffbbbb"
| 95 || July 31 || Braves || 5–6 || Javery || Hebert (6–7) || — || 3,762 || 50–42
|-

|- bgcolor="ffbbbb"
| 96 || August 1 || Braves || 3–6 (10) || Tobin || Gee (2–1) || — || — || 50–43
|- bgcolor="ccffcc"
| 97 || August 1 || Braves || 7–1 || Sewell (17–3) || Odom || — || 31,844 || 51–43
|- bgcolor="ccffcc"
| 98 || August 2 || Braves || 5–4 || Gornicki (4–8) || Barrett || — || 11,109 || 52–43
|- bgcolor="ffbbbb"
| 99 || August 3 || Braves || 1–6 || Andrews || Rescigno (5–6) || — || 2,455 || 52–44
|- bgcolor="ccffcc"
| 100 || August 4 || Phillies || 6–2 || Butcher (6–4) || Gerheauser || — || 10,417 || 53–44
|- bgcolor="ffbbbb"
| 101 || August 6 || @ Cardinals || 3–8 || Lanier || Sewell (17–4) || — || 23,976 || 53–45
|- bgcolor="ccffcc"
| 102 || August 7 || @ Cardinals || 4–1 || Hebert (7–7) || Munger || — || 3,530 || 54–45
|- bgcolor="ffbbbb"
| 103 || August 8 || @ Cardinals || 6–8 || Dickson || Rescigno (5–7) || Lanier || — || 54–46
|- bgcolor="ffbbbb"
| 104 || August 8 || @ Cardinals || 2–5 || Brecheen || Klinger (8–5) || — || 15,572 || 54–47
|- bgcolor="ffbbbb"
| 105 || August 11 || @ Phillies || 1–2 || Rowe || Sewell (17–5) || — || — || 54–48
|- bgcolor="ffbbbb"
| 106 || August 11 || @ Phillies || 0–2 || Barrett || Gornicki (4–9) || — || 11,129 || 54–49
|- bgcolor="ffbbbb"
| 107 || August 12 || @ Phillies || 3–4 || Conger || Rescigno (5–8) || Kimball || 12,065 || 54–50
|- bgcolor="ccffcc"
| 108 || August 14 || @ Phillies || 8–2 || Klinger (9–5) || Kraus || — || — || 55–50
|- bgcolor="ccffcc"
| 109 || August 14 || @ Phillies || 2–1 || Butcher (7–4) || Gerheauser || Gornicki (2) || 6,344 || 56–50
|- bgcolor="ffbbbb"
| 110 || August 15 || @ Braves || 1–5 || Tobin || Hebert (7–8) || — || — || 56–51
|- bgcolor="ccffcc"
| 111 || August 15 || @ Braves || 11–1 || Sewell (18–5) || Barrett || — || 18,400 || 57–51
|- bgcolor="ccffcc"
| 112 || August 16 || @ Braves || 5–1 || Gee (3–1) || Javery || — || 1,654 || 58–51
|- bgcolor="ccffcc"
| 113 || August 17 || @ Braves || 8–0 || Gornicki (5–9) || Andrews || — || — || 59–51
|- bgcolor="ccffcc"
| 114 || August 17 || @ Braves || 4–3 (11) || Gornicki (6–9) || Andrews || Sewell (1) || 4,831 || 60–51
|- bgcolor="ccffcc"
| 115 || August 18 || @ Giants || 7–6 (10) || Gornicki (7–9) || Allen || Sewell (2) || — || 61–51
|- bgcolor="ffbbbb"
| 116 || August 18 || @ Giants || 2–3 || Hubbell || Butcher (7–5) || — || 5,805 || 61–52
|- bgcolor="ccffcc"
| 117 || August 19 || @ Giants || 8–1 || Hebert (8–8) || Fischer || — || 2,863 || 62–52
|- bgcolor="ffbbbb"
| 118 || August 20 || @ Giants || 2–3 || Chase || Sewell (18–6) || — || — || 62–53
|- bgcolor="ffbbbb"
| 119 || August 20 || @ Giants || 4–7 || Melton || Klinger (9–6) || — || 7,050 || 62–54
|- bgcolor="ccffcc"
| 120 || August 21 || @ Giants || 4–3 || Brandt (1–1) || Feldman || — || 5,186 || 63–54
|- bgcolor="ffbbbb"
| 121 || August 22 || @ Dodgers || 1–6 || Head || Gornicki (7–10) || — || — || 63–55
|- bgcolor="ffbbbb"
| 122 || August 22 || @ Dodgers || 6–8 || Barney || Gornicki (7–11) || — || 28,285 || 63–56
|- bgcolor="ccffcc"
| 123 || August 24 || @ Dodgers || 9–6 (6) || Sewell (19–6) || Davis || Gornicki (3) || 6,611 || 64–56
|- bgcolor="ffbbbb"
| 124 || August 25 || @ Dodgers || 4–6 || Wyatt || Butcher (7–6) || Webber || 10,995 || 64–57
|- bgcolor="ffbbbb"
| 125 || August 26 || Cubs || 2–3 || Derringer || Hebert (8–9) || — || 2,107 || 64–58
|- bgcolor="ffbbbb"
| 126 || August 27 || Cubs || 2–3 || Passeau || Klinger (9–7) || — || 9,115 || 64–59
|- bgcolor="ccffcc"
| 127 || August 28 || Cubs || 5–4 || Gee (4–1) || Wyse || — || 3,154 || 65–59
|- bgcolor="ffbbbb"
| 128 || August 29 || Cubs || 2–11 || Bithorn || Sewell (19–7) || — || — || 65–60
|- bgcolor="ccffcc"
| 129 || August 29 || Cubs || 3–1 || Gornicki (8–11) || Hanyzewski || — || 19,142 || 66–60
|- bgcolor="ccffcc"
| 130 || August 30 || Cardinals || 4–3 (10) || Brandt (2–1) || Brazle || — || — || 67–60
|-

|- bgcolor="ffbbbb"
| 133 || September 1 || Cardinals || 6–8 || Dickson || Gee (4–2) || — || 5,234 || 67–63
|- bgcolor="ccffcc"
| 134 || September 3 || @ Cubs || 5–1 || Sewell (20–7) || Hanyzewski || — || 5,717 || 68–63
|- bgcolor="ccffcc"
| 135 || September 4 || @ Cubs || 7–4 || Gornicki (9–11) || Derringer || Rescigno (2) || 3,212 || 69–63
|- bgcolor="ccffcc"
| 136 || September 5 || @ Cubs || 5–4 (12) || Brandt (3–1) || Erickson || Sewell (3) || — || 70–63
|- bgcolor="ffbbbb"
| 137 || September 6 || @ Cardinals || 2–3 || Brazle || Butcher (7–7) || — || — || 70–64
|- bgcolor="ffbbbb"
| 138 || September 6 || @ Cardinals || 2–6 || Brecheen || Hebert (8–11) || — || 13,429 || 70–65
|- bgcolor="ffbbbb"
| 139 || September 8 || @ Cardinals || 1–5 || Munger || Sewell (20–8) || — || 4,049 || 70–66
|- bgcolor="ccffcc"
| 140 || September 10 || @ Reds || 9–6 || Hebert (9–11) || Beggs || — || — || 71–66
|- bgcolor="ffbbbb"
| 141 || September 10 || @ Reds || 0–1 || Walters || Butcher (7–8) || — || 9,613 || 71–67
|- bgcolor="ccffcc"
| 142 || September 11 || @ Reds || 11–1 || Klinger (10–8) || Vander Meer || — || 1,568 || 72–67
|- bgcolor="ffbbbb"
| 143 || September 12 || @ Reds || 0–1 || Riddle || Sewell (20–9) || — || — || 72–68
|- bgcolor="ccffcc"
| 144 || September 12 || @ Reds || 7–0 || Rescigno (6–8) || Starr || — || 10,303 || 73–68
|- bgcolor="ccffcc"
| 145 || September 17 || Reds || 1–0 || Butcher (8–8) || Walters || — || 6,118 || 74–68
|- bgcolor="ccffcc"
| 146 || September 19 || Reds || 10–3 || Sewell (21–9) || Riddle || — || — || 75–68
|- bgcolor="ccffcc"
| 147 || September 19 || Reds || 2–1 || Butcher (9–8) || Vander Meer || — || 13,646 || 76–68
|- bgcolor="ffbbbb"
| 148 || September 22 || Braves || 3–5 || Andrews || Gornicki (9–12) || — || 1,404 || 76–69
|- bgcolor="ffbbbb"
| 149 || September 23 || Braves || 1–2 || Tobin || Gee (4–3) || — || 1,784 || 76–70
|- bgcolor="ccffcc"
| 150 || September 25 || Giants || 7–2 || Butcher (10–8) || Chase || — || 1,530 || 77–70
|- bgcolor="ccffcc"
| 151 || September 26 || Giants || 5–0 || Klinger (11–8) || Melton || — || — || 78–70
|- bgcolor="ffbbbb"
| 152 || September 26 || Giants || 3–4 (10) || Voiselle || Gornicki (9–13) || — || 38,617 || 78–71
|- bgcolor="ccffcc"
| 153 || September 28 || Dodgers || 5–2 || Hebert (10–11) || Melton || — || — || 79–71
|- bgcolor="ccffcc"
| 154 || September 28 || Dodgers || 4–2 || Brandt (4–1) || Davis || Gornicki (4) || 3,410 || 80–71
|- bgcolor="ffbbbb"
| 155 || September 29 || Dodgers || 7–14 || Ostermueller || Rescigno (6–9) || — || 1,579 || 80–72
|-

|- bgcolor="ffbbbb"
| 156 || October 3 || Phillies || 1–3 || Barrett || Gee (4–4) || — || — || 80–73
|- bgcolor="ffbbbb"
| 157 || October 3 || Phillies || 3–11 || McKee || Cuccurullo (0–1) || — || 5,430 || 80–74
|-

|-
| Legend:       = Win       = Loss       = TieBold = Pirates team member

Opening Day lineup

Roster

Player stats

Batting

Starters by position 
Note: Pos = Position; G = Games played; AB = At bats; H = Hits; Avg. = Batting average; HR = Home runs; RBI = Runs batted in

Other batters 
Note: G = Games played; AB = At bats; H = Hits; Avg. = Batting average; HR = Home runs; RBI = Runs batted in

Pitching

Starting pitchers 
Note: G = Games pitched; IP = Innings pitched; W = Wins; L = Losses; ERA = Earned run average; SO = Strikeouts

Other pitchers 
Note: G = Games pitched; IP = Innings pitched; W = Wins; L = Losses; ERA = Earned run average; SO = Strikeouts

Relief pitchers 
Note: G = Games pitched; W = Wins; L = Losses; SV = Saves; ERA = Earned run average; SO = Strikeouts

Farm system

References 

 1943 Pittsburgh Pirates team page at Baseball Reference
 1943 Pittsburgh Pirates Page at Baseball Almanac

Pittsburgh Pirates seasons
Pittsburgh Pirates season
Pittsburg Pir